Poverty in Korea can refer to:
 Poverty in South Korea
 Poverty in North Korea